Electoral district of Ringwood may refer to:

 Electoral district of Ringwood (Victoria), an electoral district of the Victorian Legislative Assembly
 Electoral district of Ringwood (Tasmania), a former electoral district of the Tasmanian House of Assembly